Olena Dmytrivna Movchan (born 17 August 1976) is a Ukrainian world champion trampoline gymnast. She represented Ukraine at both the 2004 and 2008 Summer Olympics.

References

External links 
 
 
 

1976 births
Living people
Ukrainian female trampolinists
Gymnasts at the 2004 Summer Olympics
Gymnasts at the 2008 Summer Olympics
Sportspeople from Mykolaiv
World Games gold medalists
World Games silver medalists
Competitors at the 1997 World Games
Competitors at the 2001 World Games
Medalists at the Trampoline Gymnastics World Championships
Olympic gymnasts of Ukraine
Competitors at the 2009 World Games
20th-century Ukrainian women
21st-century Ukrainian women